Archduke Joseph Árpád Benedikt Ferdinand Franz Maria Gabriel (8 February 1933 – 30 April 2017) was a member of the Hungarian Palatine branch of the House of Habsburg-Lorraine and as such an Archduke of Austria, Prince of Hungary and Bohemia with the style His Imperial and Royal Highness.

Early life
He was born in Budapest, the son of Archduke Joseph Francis of Austria and his wife, Princess Anna of Saxony. He was the great-grandson of Archduchess Gisela of Austria.

Education
He received a degree in economics from the University of Lisbon.

Family

Joseph married Princess Maria von Löwenstein-Wertheim-Rosenberg (1935–2018), daughter of Karl, 8th Prince of Löwenstein-Wertheim-Rosenberg and Carolina dei Conti Rignon. They married civilly on 25 August 1956 and religiously on 12 September 1956 in Bronnbach, Wertheim am Main, Baden-Württemberg, Germany.

They had eight children:

 Archduke Joseph Karl of Austria (7 August 1957 – 8 August 1957).
 Archduchess Monika-Ilona Maria Carolina Stephanie Elisabeth Immacolata Benedicta Dominica of Austria (14 September 1959) she married Charles-Henry de Rambures on 18 May 1996. They have one daughter.
 Archduke Joseph Karl Maria Árpád Stephan Pius Ignatius Aloysius Cyrillus of Austria (18 March 1960) he married Princess Margarete of Hohenberg (granddaughter of Maximilian, Duke of Hohenberg) on 28 December 1990. They have four children: Archduchess Johanna of Austria (born 21 May 1992 in London), Archduke Joseph Albrecht of Austria (born 26 July 1994 in Hanover), Archduke Paul Leo of Austria (born 13 January 1996 in Hanover), Archduchess Elisabeth of Austria (born 22 September 1997 in Hanover).
 Archduchess Maria Christine Regina Stephania Immacolata Carolina Monika Ägidia of Austria (1 September 1963) she married Raymond van der Meide on 22 May 1988. They have seven children:
 Archduke Andreas-Augustinus Maria Árpád Aloys Konstantin Pius Ignatius Peter of Austria (29 April 1965) he married Countess Marie-Christine von Hatzfeldt-Donhoff on 2 October 1994. They have six children.
 Archduchess Alexandra Lydia Pia Immacolata Josepha Petra Paula Maria of Austria (29 June 1967) she married Wilhelmus de Wit on 19 June 1999. They have four children.
 Archduke Nicolaus Franziskus Alexander Nuno Josef Árpád Ruppert Donatus Virgil Maria of Austria (27 November 1973) he married Eugenia de Calonje y Gurrea in July 2002. They have four children.
 Archduke Johannes Jacobus Josef Árpád Ulrich Pius Stephan Ignatius Hermann Maria of Austria (21 May 1975) he married María Gabriela Montenegro Villamizar on 3 October 2009. They have three sons.

Dynastic honours 
 : Knight of the Order of the Golden Fleece
 : General Captain of the Order of Vitéz (1977–2017)

References

1933 births
2017 deaths
House of Habsburg-Lorraine
Knights of the Golden Fleece of Austria
Nobility from Budapest
Austrian princes